Zaborye is a rural locality (a village) in Shidrovskoye Rural Settlement of Vinogradovsky District, Arkhangelsk Oblast, Russia. The population was 52 as of 2010.

Geography 
Zaborye is located on the Vaga River, 54 km southeast of Bereznik (the district's administrative centre) by road. Ust-Vaga is the nearest rural locality.

References 

Rural localities in Vinogradovsky District